Tamil Nadu Kongu Ilaignar Peravai is a political party (Founded by Thaniyarasu) in the Indian state of Tamil Nadu. The party formed to gain votes in Kongu Vellalar, which holds nearly 15% of the Tamil Nadu electorate.

Meetings 

The association conducted a political rally at Namakkal for the 2009 Parliamentary elections with four lakh people taking part.

Election history 

Tamil Nadu Kongu Ilaignar Peravai contested 11 parliamentary constituencies in the Lok Sabha election with no alliances.

Election alliance 

For the 2011 Tamil Nadu Legislative Assembly election, it joined forces with AIADMK and obtained one seat. Thaniyarasu won the constituency of Paramathi Velur as an AIADMK candidate.

References 

State political parties in Tamil Nadu
Dravidian political parties
Regionalist parties in India
2001 establishments in Tamil Nadu
Political parties established in 2001